The 2010 Brașov Challenger was a professional tennis tournament played on outdoor red clay courts. This was the 15th edition of the tournament which is part of the 2010 ATP Challenger Tour. It took place in Brașov, Romania between 7 September and 12 September 2010.

ATP entrants

Seeds

 Rankings are as of August 30, 2010.

Other entrants
The following players received wildcards into the singles main draw:
  Victor Anagnastopol
  Daniel Brands
  Sebastian Pădure
  Răzvan Sabău

The following players received entry as an alternate:
  Petru-Alexandru Luncanu

The following players received entry from the qualifying draw:
  Kornél Bardóczky
  Adrian Cruciat
  Laurenţiu-Ady Gavrilă
  Karim Maamoun

The following players received entry as a Lucky Loser:
  Radu Albot

Champions

Singles

 Éric Prodon def.  Jaroslav Pospíšil, 7–6(1), 6–3

Doubles

 Flavio Cipolla /  Daniele Giorgini def.  Radu Albot /  Andrei Ciumac, 6–3, 6–4

References

External links
2010 Brașov Challenger at TenisRomania.ro
Singles & doubles draws

Brasov Challenger
BRD Brașov Challenger
2010 in Romanian tennis
September 2010 sports events in Romania